The  is an annual half marathon road running competition held in May in Gifu, Japan.

The first edition featured top level and popular sections for the half marathon as well as a shorter 3-kilometre fun run. All the funds raised during the event went towards the reconstruction effort following the 2011 Tōhoku earthquake and tsunami. Some 9000 people took part in the inaugural event including elite Kenyan runners Martin Mathathi and Catherine Ndereba.

The 2012 edition of the race attracted greater numbers of elite runners, both international and Japanese. Mathathi won for a second time while South Africa's René Kalmer won the women's race. In 2013 the race gained IAAF Bronze Label status and attracted six-time World Half Marathon champion Zersenay Tadese, who set a course record of 60:31 minutes to dethrone Mathathi. Mestawet Tufa knocked three minutes of the women's course record with her run of 70:03 minutes. In 2015 Eunice Kirwa improved the women's course record to 69:37 minutes.

The course for the competition starts and finishes at the Gifu Nagaragawa Stadium. It has a single-looped format and mainly follows the Nagara River in the north and central parts of the city. The first section of the race heads south for 4 km, passing through the Yanagase shopping district, until it reaches the Golden Statue of Oda Nobunaga beside Gifu Station. The course then returns north and, upon reaching the river, takes a 6 km-long route going east alongside the river, passing Mount Kinka and Gifu Castle. The course then crosses Tidori Bridge into the Nagara-Furutsu district and heads back west before finally ending up at the stadium.

The 2020 edition was cancelled due to the COVID-19 pandemic.

Past winners

Key:

See also
Kagawa Marugame Half Marathon
Sapporo Half Marathon

References

External links
Official website in English
Official website 



Half marathons
Road running competitions in Japan
Recurring sporting events established in 2011
Sport in Gifu Prefecture
Annual sporting events in Japan
2011 establishments in Japan